Hubert Frederick Fisher (October 6, 1877 – June 16, 1941) was an American politician and a member of the United States House of Representatives for the 10th congressional district of Tennessee.

Biography
Fisher was born on October 6, 1877 in Milton, Florida in Santa Rosa County son of Frederick and Mary Anna (McCarter) Fisher. He attended the common schools and graduated from the University of Mississippi at Oxford in 1898. Fisher also attended Princeton University, and was a star player on the 1901 football team. He served as the third head football coach at the University of Tennessee from 1902 to 1903, following J. A. Pierce, the initial occupant of the newly created position, and Pierce's successor, Gilbert Kelly, compiling a career record of 10–7. Like Kelley, he also played at Princeton University before coaching the Tennessee Volunteers.

Career
Fisher studied law, was admitted to the bar in 1904, and commenced practice in Memphis, Tennessee. He married Louise Sanford on November 6, 1909. He was a delegate to the Democratic National Convention in 1912. He was a member of the Tennessee Senate in 1913 and 1914. From 1914 to 1917, he was the United States district attorney for the western district of Tennessee.

Elected as a Democrat to the Sixty-fifth and to the six succeeding Congresses, Fisher served from March 4, 1917 to March 3, 1931,  but he was not a candidate for renomination in 1930. Due to deafness, he retired from legal and political activities and moved to Germantown, Tennessee, where he engaged in nursery pursuits.

Death
Fisher died on June 16, 1941 (age 63 years, 253 days) while on a visit to New York City. He is interred at Old Gray Cemetery in Knoxville, Tennessee.

Head coaching record

References

External links
 
 

1877 births
1941 deaths
Nashville Garnet and Blue football coaches
Princeton Tigers football players
Tennessee Volunteers football coaches
Democratic Party members of the United States House of Representatives from Tennessee
Democratic Party Tennessee state senators
People from Germantown, Tennessee
People from Milton, Florida
United States Attorneys for the Western District of Tennessee